Let the Good Times Roll: The Music of Louis Jordan is the thirty seventh studio album by B. B. King, released in 1999. It is a tribute album to  jazz saxophonist and singer Louis Jordan, and is made up entirely of covers of songs written or performed by Jordan. The album was released in 1999 on MCA Records.

As well as King, the album features other jazz and blues musicians including Dr. John, Earl Palmer and members of Ray Charles' band.

Track listing
"Ain't Nobody Here But Us Chickens" (Joan Whitney Kramer, Alex Kramer) - 2:51
"Is You Is or Is You Ain't My Baby" (Billy Austin, Louis Jordan) - 3:22
"Beware, Brother, Beware" (Dick Adams / Morry Lasco / Fleecie Moore)- 3:07
"Somebody Done Changed the Lock on My Door" (William "Casey Bill" Weldon) - 3:28
"Ain't That Just Like a Woman (They'll Do It Every Time)" (Claude Demetrius / Fleecie Moore)- 3:30
"Choo Choo Ch'Boogie" (Vaughn Horton / Denver Darling / Milt Gabler) - 2:37
"Buzz Me" (Danny Baxter / Fleecie Moore)- 2:52
"Early in the Mornin'" (Louis Jordan / Leo Hickman / Dallas Bartley) - 4:47
"I'm Gonna Move to the Outskirts of Town" (Andy Razaf / William "Casey Bill" Weldon) - 4:49
"Jack, You're Dead" (Dick Miles / Walter Bishop) - 2:09
"Knock Me a Kiss" (Mike Jackson / Andy Razaf) - 2:40
"Let the Good Times Roll" (Fleecie Moore / Sam Theard) - 2:39
"Caldonia" (Fleecie Moore) - 2:17
"It's a Great, Great Pleasure" (Louis Jordan / William Tennyson Jr.) - 2:38
"Rusty Dusty Blues (Mama Mama Blues)" (J. Mayo Williams) - 4:17
"Sure Had a Wonderful Time Last Night" (Claude Demetrius / Fleecie Moore)- 3:07
"Saturday Night Fish Fry" (Ellis Walsh / Louis Jordan) - 4:24
"Nobody Knows You When You're Down and Out" (Jimmy Cox) - 4:34

Personnel
B.B. King – lead vocals, lead guitar
Dr. John – piano, additional vocals
Neil Larsen – Hammond organ, piano
Hank Crawford – alto saxophone
David "Fathead" Newman – tenor saxophone
Marcus Belgrave – trumpet
Russell Malone – rhythm guitar
John Heard – bass guitar
Earl Palmer – drums
Lenny Castro – percussion

References

1999 albums
B.B. King albums
Louis Jordan tribute albums
Albums produced by Stewart Levine
MCA Records albums